Birgit Hahn (born 29 June 1958 in Mönchengladbach) is a German former field hockey player who competed in the 1984 Summer Olympics. She is the aunt of Lisa Hahn who also played Olympic hockey for Germany.

References

External links
 
 

1958 births
Living people
German female field hockey players
Olympic field hockey players of West Germany
Olympic silver medalists for West Germany
Olympic medalists in field hockey
Field hockey players at the 1984 Summer Olympics
Medalists at the 1984 Summer Olympics
Sportspeople from Mönchengladbach
20th-century German women